Natalya Gouilly (sometimes listed as Nataliya Guly, born August 19, 1974) is a Russian sprint canoer who competed in the late 1990s and early 2000s (decade). She won three medals at the ICF Canoe Sprint World Championships with a silver (K-4 200 m: 1999) and two bronzes (K-2 200 m: 1997, K-4 200 m: 1998).

Gouilly also competed in two Summer Olympics, earning her best finish of seventh on two occasions (K-4 500 m: 1996, K-4 500 m: 2000).

References

Sports-reference.com profile

1974 births
Canoeists at the 1996 Summer Olympics
Canoeists at the 2000 Summer Olympics
Living people
Olympic canoeists of Russia
Russian female canoeists
ICF Canoe Sprint World Championships medalists in kayak